Timmiella is a genus of mosses belonging to the family Timmiellaceae.

The genus has almost cosmopolitan distribution.

It was in the family Pottiaceae but due to molecular phylogenetic analysis in 2014, it was placed in Timmiellaceae. 

Species:
 Timmiella acaulon Zander, 1993
 Timmiella anomala Bruch & Schimp.

References

Moss genera